The Parnaso Español: colección de poesías escogidas de los más célebres poetas castellanos ("Spanish Parnassus: collection of selected poems from the most famous Spanish poets"), or simply Parnaso Español, is an anthology edited by Juan José López de Sedano. It was published in nine volumes, between 1768 and 1778. The first five volumes were printed by Joaquín Ibarra by request of Antonio de Sancha, who printed the remaining volumes in his newly inaugurated press.

The collection contains works by the following authors:

References 

1760s books
1770s books
Spanish books
Spanish poetry
Poetry anthologies